The Flèche Ardennaise is a single-day road bicycle race held annually in June in the province of Liège, Belgium. Since 2010, the race is organized as a 1.2 event on the UCI Europe Tour.

Winners

References

External links

UCI Europe Tour races
Recurring sporting events established in 1966
1966 establishments in Belgium
Cycle races in Belgium